Workforce.com is a workforce management technology company, whose current activities are engineering, software, research, and media. The company is headquartered in Chicago, US, and has offices in the United Kingdom, Australia, and Southeast Asia. It started in 1922 as Personnel Research Foundation, originally issuing publications dealing with workforce management.

The journal 
The publication was pioneered by James Rowland Angell, President of Yale and Carnegie Corporation in 1922; the Engineering Foundation and the National Research Council formed a joint initiative to coordinate the efforts of the 250 scientific, engineering, labor, management and educational bodies which were studying personnel problems in the United States. The first publication. Journal of personnel research, published by the Personnel Research Foundation, was a monthly magazine published from 1922-1927 ISSN 0886-750X.  OCLC 1644562 (and available of Proquest) -- see  Worldcat [https://www.worldcat.org/oclc/1644562].  The first issue was published in May 1922, and included Angell’s address to a research conference, entitled “Reasons and Plans for Research Relating to Industrial Personnel''.

From 1922 to 1996, the Journal of Personnel Research tackled different milestones, regulations, and workforce management trends and issues, including The Hawthorne Productivity Studies, Social Security Act of 1935, COBRA, and HIPA. It was continued by their journal, Personnel until 1996 [https://www.worldcat.org/oclc/976716858], also a monthly (or bi-monthly), published first by William & Wilkins for the foundation, and then from 1991-1996 by ACC Communications, Inc, Costa Mesa, CA.  ISSN 0031-5745  OCLC 1605910.

It was continued by Workforce, published by ACC Communications 1997-2003. ISSN 1092-8332. OCLC 36210566, and then by Workforce management, 2003-2013, from the same publisher ISSN 1547-5565  OCLC 52570066.  From 2003 - 2013, it was published by Crain Communications, ISSN 1547-5565   OCLC 52570066. The volume numbering was continued throughout the various titles.

The firm 
In 1997, when the Journal of Personnel Research transitioned to Workforce, it grew to be not just a magazine, but a multimedia firm servicing the HR industry with magazines, research, webinars, and events. In 2011, it introduced the Game Changers Awards, an initiative to recognize HR practitioners who have been innovative and created a positive impact on Human Resources.

In 2019, Workforce was acquired by Australian entrepreneur, Tasmine Trezise, who merged the research and media with a workforce management platform now called Workforce.com. Although started as an academic journal to document and distribute ideas and developments in workforce management using research and science, its successor, Workforce.com, works with various organizations and research bodies to explore workforce management's aspects from the point of view of management.

Technology and Workforce Management Platform 
The firm's current core activities are improving business operations and workforce management through its platform that covers employee scheduling, time and attendance, employee engagement, labor analytics, employee apps, and automated labor compliance.

It serves over 7,000 customers in some 80 countries and 10 languages. The platform is delivered as a multi-tenant cloud application and can be deployed and implemented completely remotely. It is supported with live video conference training, product documentation, and web-based customer support.

References 

1922 establishments in Illinois
Companies based in Chicago
Technology companies of the United States